The Leko languages are a small group of languages spoken in northern Cameroon and eastern Nigeria. They were labeled "G2" in Joseph Greenberg's Adamawa language-family proposal. The Duru languages are frequently classified with the Leko languages, although their relationship remains to be demonstrated.

Languages
The languages are:
Kolbila
Nyong
Chamba Leko
Wom

Names and locations (Nigeria)
Below is a list of language names, populations, and locations (in Nigeria only) from Blench (2019).

References

External links
 Leeko group – Blench

 
Leko–Nimbari languages